Gauja is a river in Latvia

Gauja may also refer to:
Gauja River (Neman tributary), a river in Lithuania and Belarus
SS Gauja, a Latvian cargo ship (1925-1941)
Gauja Formation, a Middle Devonian fossil locality in Estonia and Latvia 
Gauja National Park, Latvia
FK Gauja, a Latvian football club from Valmiera 
Gauja Station, a railway station in Latvia